The 2013–14 Minnesota Golden Gophers men's basketball team represented the University of Minnesota in the 2013-14 college basketball season. Led by first year head coach Richard Pitino for the Golden Gophers, members of the Big Ten Conference, played their home games at Williams Arena in Minneapolis, Minnesota. They finished the season 25–13, 8–10 in Big Ten play to finish in seventh place. They advanced to the quarterfinals of the Big Ten tournament where they lost to Wisconsin. They were invited to the National Invitation Tournament where they defeated High Point, Saint Mary's, Southern Miss, Florida State and SMU to be the 2014 NIT Champions.

Departures

Incoming recruits

Roster

Schedule and results

|-
! colspan="9" style="text-align: center; background:#800000" | Exhibition 

|-
! colspan="9" style="text-align: center; background:#800000"|Regular season

|-
! colspan="9" style="text-align: center; background:#800000"|Big Ten regular season

|-
! colspan="9" style="text-align: center; background:#800000"|Big Ten tournament

|-
! colspan="9" style="text-align: center; background:#800000"|National Invitation Tournament

References

Minnesota Golden Gophers men's basketball seasons
Minnesota
Minnesota
National Invitation Tournament championship seasons
Minnesota Golden Gophers men's basketball team
Minnesota Golden Gophers men's basketball team